The 1976 National Football League (NFL) expansion draft was held March 30–31, 1976.  The expansion teams, the Seattle Seahawks and the Tampa Bay Buccaneers, each selected 39 players from the other 26 NFL teams. Before the draft, each of the existing NFL teams was allowed to protect 29 players from selection by the expansion teams. When one player was chosen from an existing team, that team was then permitted to protect two additional players. The expansion teams continued until three players had been picked from each of the existing teams.

The expansion draft was originally scheduled for January 23–24, but was postponed when the owners of the Seahawks and Buccaneers filed a lawsuit against the players' union with worries that the organization would try to prevent the draft. The court case delayed both the expansion draft and the annual college draft.

Seattle selections

Tampa Bay selections

References

National Football League expansion draft
Expansion Draft, 1976
Seattle Seahawks lists
Tampa Bay Buccaneers lists
NFL expansion draft